The 2008 Myanmar Grand Royal Challenge Cup was the third edition of the Myanmar Grand Royal Challenge Cup, an annual football tournament held in Myanmar. The tournament took place from 11 November to 21 November 2008 in Yangon.

Teams

 (hosts)
 Ulsan Hyundai Reserves*
**

*: An invitee from the South Korean K League, Ulsan sent their reserve team.

**: Vietnam sent their under-23 team.

Group stage

Group A

Group B

Knockout stages

Semi-finals

Final

Winners

Goalscorers
5 goals:
   Soe Myat Min

2 goals:
  Mohd Amirul Hadi Zainal

1 goal:

  Firman Utina
  Talaohu Musafri
  Ismed Sofyan
  Indra Putra Mahayuddin
  Mohammad Hardi Jaafar
  Mohd Zaquan Adha Abdul Radzak
  Aung Kyaw Moe
  Yan Paing
  Kyaw Thiha
  Seo Sung-Hwan
  Lee Jin-Woo
  Kim Sung-Min
  Kim Cheol-Bae
  Young Seok
  Hoàng Nhật Nam

1 own goal
 Moe Win (for Indonesia)

2008
Grand Royal Challenge Cup
2008 in Malaysian football
2008 in Bangladeshi football
2008 in South Korean football
2008 in Vietnamese football
2008–09 in Indonesian football